Emanuela Da Ros is a journalist and Italian writer of children's books.

She graduated in art history with a thesis on ancient Byzantine art at the University of Padua in 1985. Then she became an Italian teacher in a high-school in Vittorio Veneto. She started her writing activity in 2000, and she won the first prize at the International Children's Literature Award of Bologna, as the best unpublished Italian writer.

Bibliography
Poste e risposte, 2000
Il giornalino Larry, 2001 (translated into German)
I love school, 2002
Lui è bellissimo!, 2004 (translated into Greek, German and Korean)
Un cuoco da ragazzi, 2005
Io voglio, 2007
Avventure in cucina, 2008
Ma Babbo Natale non ce l'ha il cellulare?, 2009
Se, 2011

References

External links
Emanuela Da Ros' blog

Living people
People from Vittorio Veneto
Italian children's writers
Italian women writers
Italian women children's writers
Year of birth missing (living people)